The 2006–07 Dayton Flyers men's basketball team represented the University of Dayton during the 2006–07 NCAA Division I men's basketball season. The Flyers, led by fourth year head coach Brian Gregory, played their home games at the University of Dayton Arena and were members of the Atlantic 10 Conference. They finished the season 19–12, 8–8 in A-10 play. The Flyers started the season 10-1, with wins over NCAA Tournament teams Louisville, Holy Cross, and Creighton, before stumbling during A-10 play. The Flyers advanced to the quarterfinals of the Atlantic 10 tournament where they lost to regular season champion Xavier. Dayton was not selected to play in a postseason tournament, marking the 3rd consecutive season the Flyers did not play in a postseason tournament.

Previous season
The 2005–06 Dayton Flyers finished the season 14–17, with a record of 6–10 in the Atlantic 10 regular season. The Flyers season ended in the first round of the 2006 Atlantic 10 men's basketball tournament against Saint Joseph's.

Incoming recruits

Roster

Schedule

|-
!colspan=9 style="background:#C40023; color:#75B2DD;"| Exhibition

|-
!colspan=9 style="background:#C40023; color:#75B2DD;"| Non-conference regular season

|-
!colspan=9 style="background:#C40023; color:#75B2DD;"| Atlantic 10 regular season

|-
!colspan=9 style="background:#C40023; color:#75B2DD;"| Atlantic 10 tournament

References

Dayton Flyers men's basketball seasons
Dayton
Dayton
Dayton